The Eastern Isles (islands of the salt water downs) are a group of twelve small uninhabited islands within the Isles of Scilly Area of Outstanding Natural Beauty, part of the Scilly Heritage Coast and a Site of Special Scientific Interest (SSSI) first designated in 1971 for its flora and fauna. They have a long period of occupation from the Bronze Age with cairns and entrance graves through to Iron Age field systems and a Roman shrine on Nornour. Before the 19th century, the islands were known by their Cornish name, which had also become the name of the largest island in the group after the submergence of the connecting lands.

Geography
The islands are located to the south–east of St Martin's, and are within the Isles of Scilly Area of Outstanding Natural Beauty and part of the Scilly Heritage Coast.

The Isles are not so exposed to gales as the Western Rocks; consequently the soils do not receive so much salt spray, and remnant habitats such as coastal grassland and maritime heath have survived the inundation of the sea. If the practice of summer grazing had continued, there would be even more grassland instead of the dense bramble which has smothered some of the small growing plants.

The islands by area are:
Great Ganilly 
Great, Middle and Little Arthur 
Menawethan 
Little Ganilly 
Great Innisvouls 
Great Ganinick 
Nornour 
Little Ganinick 
Little Innisvouls 
Ragged Island 
Guther's 
Hanjague

Geology
The underlying rock is coarse grained Hercynian granite topped by wind–blown sand. Some of the islands are linked with boulder ridges and sandy bars and at low tide can be viewed as one island. During the Roman occupation of England and Wales the area was a low–lying plain between St Mary's and St Martins and the present Eastern Isles small hills. The Isles of Scilly are a Geological Conservation Review (GCR) site for the largest assemblage of tied islands outside of Orkney and Shetland. Four islands represent the different stages in the linking of islands by a sandy bar or tombola and they are Teän (not part of the Eastern Isles) which is to the north–west, between St Martin's and Tresco; and Great Arthur, Great Ganinick and Little Ganinick which are to the south–east of St Martin's.

Wildlife and ecology
Most of the islands have dense cover of bramble Rubus fruticosus and bracken Pteridium aquilinum and grassland along the coastal fringes. Goldenrod (Solidago virgaurea) is locally abundant amongst the heath communities growing on the podzolic soils on the higher parts of the islands. The heaths are classified as a poor fit somewhere between H10 and H11 and the heather (Calluna vulgaris), bell heather (Erica cinerea) and bracken merge into pure bracken on the lower slopes. A feasibility study is needed to decide if the vegetation would benefit from grazing through a Higher Level Stewardship (HLS) agreement. With no resident botanist, together with the difficulty of recording on remote islands, there are not many plant records and the number of species for each of the Eastern Isles was finally published in 1971 from surveys carried out by J D Grose, Mr & Mrs J E Dallas and J E Lousley in 1938 and 1939. Lousley listed 111 species of higher plants in his 1971 Flora, and by 1999 further surveys recorded a similar number (114). Some of the islands have species that are only found on that island and not on the other Eastern Isles such as an oak tree found by Mr and Mrs Dallas on Great Gannick. Possible ancient woodland indicators such as butcher's-broom (Ruscus aculeatus), wood spurge (Euphorbia amygdaloides) and wood small-reed (Calamagrostis epigejos) have also been recorded on Great Gannick. The nationally rare orange bird's-foot (Ornithopus pinnatus) is found on the northern side of Great Ganilly.

The Eastern Isles are one of three main grey seal (Halichoerus grypus) pupping areas, Western Rocks and Norrard Rocks being the others. Four other mammals have been recorded: rabbit, brown rat described as a plague on some of the Eastern Isles, house mouse and the so-called Scilly shrew.

The isles are also home to breeding colonies of eight species of seabird; including three species of gull, as well as the common shag (Phalacrocorax aristotelis), great cormorant (Phalacrocorax carbo), northern fulmar (Fulmarus glacialis), razorbill (Alca torda) and puffin (Fratercula arctica). Several of the isles are closed to visitors during the birds' breeding season (15 April to 20 August).

The islands

Great Ganilly

Great Ganilly (great salt water down), is the largest of the Eastern Isles and consists of two hills joined together by a low sandy neck. Stones from the chamber have been used to make a pyramidal navigational marker. Other evidence of past occupation include a hut circle on the neck as well as the remains of field systems. A freshwater spring would have made living on the island during the kelp burning season possible. The hills have maritime heath on each summit and dense bracken communities on the lower slopes. A total of seventy-four plant species were recorded in the surveys of 1938 and 1939; the largest number of species on any of the Eastern Isles and includes Portland and sea spurge, sea–kale and balm–leaved figwort in the small sand dune system. Common thyme and orange bird's–foot grow on the heath, which is dominated by bell heather (Erica cinerea). Betony (Stachys officinalis) which is a common plant in Cornwall but known from only two places in Scilly was discovered simultaneously here, and on Tresco in 1998, but was not seen in 2000. Mammals recorded are rabbit, brown rat, house mouse and Scilly shrew.

Great, Middle and Little Arthur
The Arthurs (facing land), part of the Geological Conservation Review site (GCR), are three rocky islands joined by two beaches forming a crescent around Arthur Porth; compare with Great Ganinick and Little Ganinick (see below) where the process is ongoing. Great Arthur, as the name suggests, is the largest with a fringe of maritime grassland, dune vegetation and strandline vegetation. There are three entrance graves on the summit ridge connected by a prehistoric boulder wall. They are surrounded by maritime heath with English stonecrop on the bare areas. The area of blown sand is dominated by marram grass (Ammophila arenaria) which helps to stabilise the dunes and shelter a relatively rich flora of non-maritime plants such as a stunted grey sallow (Salix cinerea). This (probably the same) plant is recorded in both Louseley (1971) and Parslow (1997).

Middle Arthur has an unusual boat-shaped entrance grave on the summit with walls of standing slabs. A ceramic burial urn together with pieces of bone and flint were found during excavations in 1953. The island as a few patches of heather and some strandline vegetation on the sheltered parts of its shore, while Little Arthur has bracken on the deeper soils and heath on the summit with English stonecrop in the bare areas. Also on Little Arthur is a small area of strandline vegetation and sand dunes with slender St John's-wort (Hypericum pulchrum); a plant common in Cornwall but uncommon in the Isles of Scilly.

Menawethan
Menawethan (the tree stone), is a steep-sided island to the south–east of the group with vegetation that is typical of islands with breeding seabirds. It was one of the first islands where Natural England carried out rat eradication. Some areas are covered in hottentot fig (probably carried to the island by gulls); thrift and sea campion also dominate in some areas. Other species recorded include Yorkshire fog, orache, common scurvy-grass and tree-mallow which forms temporary stands in some years. Brookweed (Samolus valerandi), a plant restricted to cliff flushes in Cornwall and an unusual plant in Scilly, grows among rocks above the shore. The rocky shore is used by grey seal for haul outs. There is a Bronze Age cairn on the summit. The island is recorded as Mynangwython c1588.

Little Ganilly
Little Ganilly (little salt water down) is just to the north of Little Arthur and has a small area of heath on the summit. Bracken dominates the slopes and there are maritime grassland and cliff communities along the coast which has several small caves on the east side. Surveys in 1938 and 1939 recorded 37 species of plants. The only mammals recorded are brown rats and grey seals which use the island as a haul out.

Great Innisvouls and Little Innisvouls
Great Innisvouls (great wether island), has a small area of maritime grassland and bracken, and Little Innisvouls (little wether island) has strandline plant species. Both have breeding seabirds and the Scilly shrew has been recorded on Great Innisvouls. Gurney reported twelve pairs of shag with egg and one pair with young on Great Iinnisvouls on 12 May 1887.

To the north–east of Little Innisvouls is a small rock called Mouls (wether (a castrated male sheep)),  where a nationally scarce pseudoscorpion, Neobisium maritimum was found in 1927.

Great Ganinick and Little Ganinick

The islands of Great Ganinick and Little Ganinick (place of wild garlic), are part of the GCR and are in an early stage of the linkage of two islands by a tombola. The sand bar is building from Little Ganinick, northwards, towards the larger island although the sand supply does not appear to be sufficient to link the two islands. On the north side of Great Ganinick a "cuspate" shaped beach is forming. Great Ganinick has the only known oak tree in the Eastern Islands. Described by Mr and Mrs Dallas in 1938 as ″.... about 2 ft 6in (0.76 m) tall in tangle of bracken, bramble and honeysuckle. It was still there (or possibly one like it) in 1997. Great Ganinick is rich in plant species with 74 species recorded by Lousley including butcher's–broom, wood spurge, wood small–reed and white ramping–fumitory. Little Ganinick has grassland with strandline vegetation and seabird colonies.

Nornour
Nornour (facing the mainland), consists of one hill covered in bracken to the north of Great Ganilly, joined to it at low tide by a boulder causeway. There was a long period of habitation during the Bronze and Iron Ages when Nornour would have been part of a larger island; after a storm in 1962, the erosion of sand dunes uncovered hut circles. Eleven circular stone buildings were found, and the site was excavated in 1962–66 and 1969–73. Many features were found including doorways, dividing walls, steps, hearths, querns and stone-lined pits. Two of the buildings have since disappeared under beach boulders. Among the numerous Roman finds found in the two western huts were more than three hundred brooches, dating from the later first to the later third century AD. They were found in the upper layers of two of the prehistoric buildings, along with coins (late first to late fourth century), glass, miniature pots and pieces of small clay Gallic figurines. The earliest coins are from Vespasian (AD 69–79) and the later date indicate that the site was still being used into the late fourth century. Analysis of the brooches indicate they came from numerous places in Britain and the Continent; given that there are no comparable sites on Scilly, this suggests that the finds were not for trade but perhaps for paying respect to a local cult. The finds indicate a shrine, and Sulis has been suggested. With dates ranging over four centuries, it is unlikely that the objects came from a shipwreck. Despite attempts to protect the archaeological site sea erosion still occurs.

The boilers of the paddle steamer Earl of Arran can be seen at low tide on the western shore. She hit Irishman's Ledge on 16 July 1872, when the Captain attempted to take a short cut through English Island Neck.

There is a small area of heath on the hill with heather and bell heather and in the disturbed area around the hut circles. The nationally scarce plants Portland spurge (Euphorbia portlandica) and balm–leaved figwort (Scrophularia scorodonia) have been recorded on Nornour, as has butcher's–broom, sea spurge (Euphorbia paralias) and sea spleenwort (Asplenium marinum) The endangered shore dock (Rumex rupestris) colony has not been seen since 1970.

Ragged Island
Ragged Island has two unexpected plants; Chilean hard-fern (Blechnum cordatum) and borage (Borago officinalis). It is not known how they got there, neither species was recorded by Lousley in his 1971 Flora, although spores from ferns can be blown some distance; Chilean hard-fern was recorded in Higher Town, St Martin's in 1936. Other species recorded include thrift, scurvy grass, hastate orache and sea beet.

Guther's

Guther's (or Gunther's) (channels), is a small island which lies on the western side of the Eastern Isles and south of St Martin's. It has limited vegetation consisting of grass, docks and sea beet. Greater black-backed (Larus marinus) and herring gulls (L. argentatus) nest, as do common shags. It is possible to walk out to this island from St Martin's at exceptional low tides, but great care must be taken not to be cut off.

Hanjague
Hanjague (the windy one) is a sea stack approximately one km north-east of Great Gannilly, and is the easternmost island in the archipelago. The island has no vegetation and is used as a roost by birds.

English Island
The rock is between English Island point, St Martin's to the north, and Nornour to the south-east.

See also

 List of islands
 List of shipwrecks of the Isles of Scilly

References

External links

 SSSI map
 Isles of Scilly Seabird Recovery Project: Frequently asked questions
 Geological Conservation Review site
 Modern Antiquarian
 Isles of Scilly Wildlife Trust

Uninhabited islands of the Isles of Scilly
Sites of Special Scientific Interest in the Isles of Scilly
Sites of Special Scientific Interest notified in 1971